William "Honey" Mellody (January 15, 1884 – March 2, 1919) was an American boxer who took the Welterweight Championship of the World on October 16, 1906, defeating former champion Joe Walcott in a fifteen-round points decision in Chelsea, Massachusetts.

Early career
Mellody was born on January 15, 1884, in Charlestown, Massachusetts. He fought several amateur bouts in the Boston area near the bottom of the lightweight limit in 1901 and early 1902.  Turning professional, he began fighting talented opponents early in his career, drawing with Irish boxer Martin Canole at the Bowdoin Square Athletic Club in Boston in six rounds on April 29, 1902 by decision of the Boston Globe. By 1904, Canole had met welterweight contenders Jimmy Gardiner, Willie Lewis and future 1908 lightweight champion Battling Nelson.

On March 31, 1903, Mellody defeated former New England Lightweight Champion Mosey King, a native New Londoner, who would later help chair the first Connecticut Boxing Commission and serve as head coach of boxing at Yale for 46 years.  On June 30, 1903, Mellody was knocked out by Joe Nelson, who would box as a talented middle and welterweight against Blink McCloskey, and gifted "Colored" Light Heavyweight World Championship contender George Robinson.  Mellody had drawn with Nelson in November 1902 early in his career. In October and November 1903, he knocked out Billy Gardner, brother of leading Welterweight contender Jimmy, and defeated Belfield Walcott, brother of lightweight champion Joe.

Winning the Welterweight "White" Championship

Mellody took the World "White" Championship defeating the older New York boxer Matty Matthews in a 12-round points decision in Boston on January 13, 1904. The title was a precursor to his Welterweight World Title, but carried far less authority and required a boxer to weigh very close to 142 pounds, still in the welter range.  He defended his title for the World "White" Championship for 145 pounds against Martin Duffy on April 22, 1904, in a fourth-round knockout in Chicago.  Mellody outweighed Duffy who was six pounds below the 145 pound limit.  He defended his title twice against Jack O'Keefe in June and October 1904.

He lost the 145 pound "White" championship against talented welterweight Buddy Ryan in Chicago in a first round knockout and was down three times in the bout. He had lost to Ryan twice previously in Chicago, though one of the decisions was questionable.  After losing to Ryan, Mellody began an impressive ramp up to a Welterweight World Title bout.

Winning the World Welterweight Championship
After losing to Buddy Ryan, Mellody won eleven bouts by knockout prior to his first World Welterweight Championship title fight, facing boxers who could be described as competent fringe contenders. He knocked out Fred Douglas, Jerry McCarthy twice, Martin Duffy in May 1905, George Peterson in October 1905, Jack O'Keefe in November 1905, and Terry Martin twice in February and March 1906.  He knocked out Charley McKeever twice in Chelsea, Massachusetts in eleven and six rounds in March and April 1906. McKeever was an older competitor a bit past his prime, but had been capable of once facing both a young Joe Walcott, and former welterweight world champion "Mysterious" Billy Smith three times. Mellody's third round knockout of contender Willie Lewis in Chelsea, Massachusetts three months before facing Walcott foreshadowed his imminent conquest of the World Welterweight Title.

Mellody got his first shot for the World Welterweight title against the legendary Barbados Joe Walcott on October 16, 1906, at the Lincoln Athletic Club in Chelsea, Massachusetts. The Pittsburgh Press noted Mellody was barely 21 at the time of the fight and had been fighting professionally for only around three years. The bout required the full fifteen rounds before Mellody was given the decision on points against his strong and seasoned opponent.

In a rematch on November 29, 1906, Mellody beat Walcott again in a 12th-round TKO in Chelsea, although Walcott claimed an injured arm which doctors at ringside confirmed.  Walcott's return to the ring after accidentally shooting himself in the hand two years earlier showed great determination, and the skill he displayed in his first title match with Mellody indicated that without his injury he may have remained champion.  The New London Day echoed the same sentiment when it wrote "Age, long service, and an accident to his good right hand, along with his jovial way of living abridged Walcott's career as a champion, for he could have been a factor for many years to come were it not for the "automatic shooter" that he displayed once too often."

Mellody then defeated Willie Lewis for the second time in a non-title fight by a fourth-round TKO in Rhode Island on February 11, 1907. Lewis was soon to become a talented welterweight contender and frequent opponent of champion Harry Lewis.

Mellody lost the title, by referee decision, in a long twenty-round match in Los Angeles, California, against the older but possibly stronger Mike "Twin" Sullivan on April 23, 1907.  Both boxers weighed in at 145, clearly in the welterweight range. The Shreveport Caucasian wrote of the bout, "At all stages Sullivan showed unmistakable superiority and out generated Mellody in infighting.  Mellody's tactics were confined to rushes generally ending in clinches where Sullivan used right upper cuts and short hand jabs to the face with telling effect".  The Washington Evening Star noted that "during the early rounds Mellody had an even break with his clever opponent", but "Sullivan came back strong and from the twelfth had it all his own way."

Boxing after loss of the World Title

In late 1907 and early 1908, Mellody fought an impressive array of welterweight contenders, after losing to Sullivan.   In November 1907, he lost to Frank Mantell in fifteen rounds in Chicago, and in February 1908, he lost to Unk Russell in a title fight.  More importantly in April 1908, in a title fight, he lost to Mike Sullivan's Welterweight Championship successor Harry Lewis at the armory in Boston. The Gazette Times wrote of the fight that "Lewis scored a knockdown in the first round and in point of cleverness outclassed Mellody," in the exceptional fourth-round knockout. Several other boxers vied to claim the title as it was vacant at the time, but most sources now recognize Lewis's claim. Lewis would hold the title for three years and collect more fame and recognition as champion than either Sullivan or Mellody. Mellody started on a quest to box many of the welterweight contenders who knew a fight with the ex-champion would add to their pocketbooks and might serve as a stepping stone to their shot at a title fight.

Mellody would recover some of his form beating quality welterweights Frank Peron, Unk Russell, and Terry Martin in the first half of 1910, though no longer by quick knockout. He fought Peron twice more and Maurice Lemoine twice as well mostly to draws, with one knockout of Lemoine on August 31, 1910.  Partly due to the young age at which he took the title, Mellody would continue to fight more opponents and for more years than most ex-champions. Welterweight Abe Hollandersky had fought Lemoine in a close six-round bout as a preliminary to a World Welterweight Title fight with Harry Lewis in New Haven in December 1908, and would unsuccessfully issue a challenge to Mellody as well through the New London Day on September 13, 1910. Mellody, as an ex-champion, had no trouble finding welterweights who would draw larger audiences.

Later boxing career
In 1911, Mellody continued to fight rated welterweight contenders, but lost a higher percentage of his fights.  He faced Jimmy Perry, Paddy Lavin, and Frank Peron in the first half of 1911, in Pittsburgh, Buffalo, and Newport, Rhode Island, losing all three, by newspaper decision. He fought Joe Stein, a less skilled boxer than many of his earlier opponents, twice more in New York in the latter half of 1911, beating him in ten-round bouts by the decision of newspapers. In the Perry fight, the Gazette Times agreed Perry had the edge, and wrote, "Jim Perry...gave that veteran formidable fighter Honey Mellody a hard battle last night before the Northern Club.  Had referee Tom Bodkins been powered with the right to render a decision, he no doubt would have awarded the fight to Perry. For the first few rounds Mellody had a slight advantage in the boxing, but all ground Mellody had gained in that time was lost in the third session when Perry became effective."

In 1912, he beat Billy West twice in Manhattan clubs by a disqualification and a newspaper decision, before losing to more talented opponents Al Rogers, Terry Martin, and Terry Mitchell in fifteen-, twelve- and ten-round newspaper decisions. In the fight with Rogers on June 10, 1912, the Boston Globe noted that "Rodgers hammered the Bostonian (Mellody) all around the arena in every one of the 15 rounds."

In 1913, BoxRec noted that Mellody fought Noah Brusco, Dave Powers, and Harry Rice, losing two to newspaper decisions. Mellody seemed to have stayed close to the welterweight limit for even these later fights, though he weighed in a 150 for the Rice fight, near the upper range of welterweight fighters. These three boxers did not have the reputation or skills of the boxers he had faced in 1912.

Later life
In 1908, he owned a drug store at 437 Columbus Avenue in Boston.

Roughly five to six years after his retirement from boxing, Mellody became sick and died of pneumonia on March 2, 1919.   He was only thirty-five years of age.

Professional boxing record
All information in this section is derived from BoxRec, unless otherwise stated.

Official record

All newspaper decisions are officially regarded as “no decision” bouts and are not counted in the win/loss/draw column.

Unofficial record

Record with the inclusion of newspaper decisions in the win/loss/draw column.

See also
Lineal championship
List of welterweight boxing champions

References

|- 

|-

External links
 

World boxing champions
World welterweight boxing champions
Welterweight boxers
Boxers from Massachusetts
American male boxers
1884 births
1919 deaths